Arthur Cantrelle (born July 25, 1948) is a retired Canadian Football League player who played for the Ottawa Rough Riders. He also played in the World Football League for the Birmingham Americans and Birmingham Vulcans in 1974-75. Cantrelle scored 10 rushing touchdowns during the 1975 season. He played college football at Louisiana State University.

References

1948 births
Living people
Ottawa Rough Riders players
Players of American football from Louisiana
Sportspeople from Thibodaux, Louisiana
LSU Tigers football players
Birmingham Americans players
Birmingham Vulcans players